Galiano Pividori (25 July 1914 – 24 May 1988) was an Italian racing cyclist. He rode in the 1950 Tour de France. Italian by birth, he was naturalized French on 6 January 1965.

References

External links
 

1914 births
1988 deaths
Italian male cyclists
Place of birth missing
Italian emigrants to France
Cyclists from Friuli Venezia Giulia
People from the Province of Udine